Fyans is a surname. Notable people with the surname include:

Foster Fyans (1790–1870), British Army soldier, penal colony administrator, and public servant
J. Thomas Fyans (1918–2008), American Mormon leader

See also
Fyan